Atínale al Precio (Get the Price Right) is a Mexican game show based on The Price Is Right that has aired in two separate runs on Televisa, both hosted by Marco Antonio Regil. The format is similar to the American version of the show, featuring many pricing games that have also appeared on that version.

1997 version

The show 

This version borrowed many elements from the American version (from set, game styles and a salsa arrangement of the U.S. main theme). Regil was pointed out by American host Bob Barker in the VIP of the audience of a U.S. episode in 1997 and was a candidate to host the US version during the 2007 tryouts. This show also included a light border in its intro, a la the U.S. show, but other elements were borrowed from the UK Bob Warman's show, like in-show sponsorship and a car in the Showcase Showdown.

One Bid 

The four players in Contestants' Row compete in a One Bid qualifying game to determine which contestant will play the next pricing game. A prize usually worth MXN$2,500 or less is shown and, beginning with the last player to be called down (or the player farthest-left during the first One Bid), each contestant gives a single bid for the item. The order of bidding moves from left to right. Contestants must bid in whole pesos and may not bid the same amount as any player bid previously for that item. The player whose bid is closest to the actual retail price of the prize without going over wins the prize and plays the next pricing game.  A bonus of MXN$1,000 is given for bidding the exact price of the item.

If all four contestants overbid, a buzzer sounds before the price is revealed. The host announces the lowest bid, the bids are erased and the bidding process is repeated in the same manner with the contestants instructed to bid lower than the lowest of the original bids.

Pricing games 
A total of 47 games were played in rotation:

Showcase Showdown (La Ruleta)

The Showcase Showdown was played the same way as on the American version. If the wheel stopped at the MXN$1, the contestant won a bonus prize of MXN$1,000 and a bonus spin. In the bonus spin, if the wheel stopped on MXN$0.05, the contestant won a bonus prize of MXN$5,000; if it stopped on MXN$0.15, the player won a bonus prize of MXN$15,000; and if it stopped on MXN$1, a new car was won. The higher number without exceeding MXN$1 (if nobody spun the peso) went on to the Showcase (known in Mexico as El Gran Paquete); in the event of a tie, the tied players advanced to a one-spin spin-off.  The highest number won the place in the Showcase.

If multiple players spun the peso, the bonus spin simultaneously acted as a spin-off; only the spin-off score counted, not the bonus prizes (i.e., if a player spun 15 and won MXN$15,000, it would not beat the second player if their spin was anywhere from 20 to the peso, or 1.00).  The highest number again won the place in the Showcase.  However, if the bonus spin also ended in a tie, there was another spin-off, but no more money could be won.

A specific two-note buzzer was used when a player lost the Showcase Showdown, regardless of whether or not they exceeded MXN$1.

The Showcase (El Gran Paquette)

The Showcase followed the same rules as the U.S. version when the show aired in 1997, with a 100 peso rule for both showcases (the US version's rule changed in 1998 to US$250, but the rule stayed at MXN$100). The closest bid without going over won the showcase, and won both if their bid came within 100 pesos of the actual price of the Showcase. If there was a double overbid, neither won their showcase.

The show had only two double showcase winners in its original run; the first winner came within MXN$83 of the actual retail price, while the second came within MNX$36.

2010 version

The Show 
This version incorporated elements from the American, British, French and Italian versions. Reruns aired from October 4, 2010 until January 21, 2011.  The show was sponsored by the supermarket chain Chedraui, and cars were supplied by General Motors; the intro was similar to the French show.

Unlike the previous incarnation, the announcer introduced host Regil before the first four contestants were called on down.

One Bid 

The four players in Contestants' Row compete in a One Bid qualifying game to determine which contestant will play the next pricing game. A prize usually worth MXN$6,000 or less is shown and, beginning with the last player to be called down (or the player farthest-left during the first One Bid), each contestant gives a single bid for the item. The order of bidding moves from left to right. Contestants must bid in whole pesos and may not bid the same amount as any player bid previously for that item. The player whose bid is closest to the actual retail price of the prize without going over wins the prize and plays the next pricing game. However, a "cha-ching" sound signifies a perfect bid; whoever gave that exact bid would win a 1,000 peso bonus in addition.

If all four contestants overbid, a buzzer sounds before the price is revealed. The host announces the lowest bid, the bids are erased and the bidding process is repeated in the same manner with the contestants instructed to bid lower than the lowest of the original bids.

Pricing games 
A total of 43 games were played in rotation:

Showcase Showdown 

La Ruleta (Showcase Showdown) followed faithfully to the United States version in the first and second Showcase Showdowns, with the wheel's patterns faithful to the counterpart to the north (100, 15, 80, 35, 60, 20, 40, 75, 55, 95, 50, 85, 30, 65, 10, 45, 70, 25, 90, 5).  The bonus for MXN$1 (one or two spins) was worth MXN$1,000. The highest number won the showdown; in the event of a tie, the contestants got one spin each, with the highest number winning the showdown.

The bonus spin was administered in the same way as the original Mexican version.  If the wheel stopped on the MXN$.05, the bonus was MXN$5,000. If the wheel stopped on MXN$1, a new car was awarded.  If the wheel stopped on MXN$.15, the contestant won MXN$15,000. If the tie involved ran concurrently with the bonus spin, there was another spin-off, but no more money could be won.

At the end of the second Showcase Showdown, the two winners participated in a spinoff to determine the player who advances to the one-player Showcase.  There were no bonuses for going MXN$1 in this spin.

Regardless of whether the player was over or under MXN$1, a two-note buzzer sounded if they lost the showdown.

Gran Paquete (The Showcase) 

The Showcase was played in the one-player format similar to European versions and the 1994 syndicated version of the show, with the price ranges between MXN$5,000 and MXN$30,000, and whatever the contestant stopped was the range the contestant had to come from the actual retail price of the Showcase without going over to win it. The closest win was MXN$16 from the actual retail price.

Merchandise 
A board game based on the 2010 version with Marco Antonio Regil along with La Ruleta (Showcase wheel) on the cover of the box has been released by Fotorama in 2010.

References

Las Estrellas original programming
The Price Is Right
Mexican game shows
Television series by Fremantle (company)
Mexican television series based on American television series